Members of the New South Wales Legislative Council who served from 1856 to 1861 were appointed for a fixed term by the Governor on the advice of the Premier. The 1855 Constitution of New South Wales provided that the first council following self-government was for a period of 5 years from the first appointments, but that subsequent members would be appointed for life. The first appointments were on 13 May 1856 so that the first term lapsed on 13 May 1861. The number of members of the council had to be at least 21 and subsequent appointments also lapsed on 13 May 1861. The President was Sir Alfred Stephen until 28 January 1857, John Plunkett until 6 February 1858 and then Sir William Burton.

The 3 judges of the Supreme Court, Sir Alfred Stephen, John Dickson and Roger Therry were all among the initial appointments  to the Legislative Council in 1856. Stephen accepted the position of President and was particularly active in the council, introducing 14 bills, 6 of which were passed by the parliament. Judges sitting in the Council became controversial and Stephen resigned as President on 28 January 1857. Dickinson resigned from the Council on 29 March 1858, Stephen resigned from the Council on 12 November 1858, while Therry continued to sit until after he retired as a judge on 31 January 1859. Therry's replacement on the Supreme Court, Samuel Milford, was not appointed to the Council and Edward Wise resigned from the Council upon his appointment to the Supreme Court.

The term ended in controversy when Charles Cowper and John Robertson attempted to swamp the chamber by appointing 21 new members on 10 May 1861, because the council had rejected the Robertson land bills. When the council met and the new members were waiting to be sworn in, the President Sir William Burton stated that he felt he had been treated with discourtesy in the matter, resigned his office of president and his membership, and left the chamber. 19 other members also resigned in protest. In the absence of the President and Chairman of Committees, under the standing orders the council was adjourned until the next sitting day. There were no further sitting days before the terms of the members of council expired.

See also
 Donaldson ministry (1856)
 First Cowper ministry (1856)
 Parker ministry (1856–1857)
 Second Cowper ministry (1857–1859)
 Forster ministry (1859–1860)
 First Robertson ministry (1860–1861)
 Third Cowper ministry (1861–1863)

Notes

References

 

Members of New South Wales parliaments by term
19th-century Australian politicians